The 1998 Individual Ice Speedway World Championship was the 33rd edition of the World Championship  The Championship was held as a Grand Prix series over ten rounds. 

Alexander Balashov of Russia won his third World title.

Classification

See also 
 1998 Speedway Grand Prix in classic speedway
 1998 Team Ice Racing World Championship

References 

Ice speedway competitions
World